The 1964 United States Senate election in Mississippi was held on November 3, 1964. Incumbent Democratic U.S. Senator John C. Stennis won re-election to his fourth term.

Because Stennis was unopposed in the general election, his victory in the June 2 primary was tantamount to election. He defeated civil rights activist Victoria Gray Adams, a member of the Mississippi Freedom Democratic Party in a landslide. Even As Republican Barry Goldwater Defeated Incumbent President  Lyndon Johnson by 78 points  in the concurrent presidential race in the state despite loosing in a landslide nationally  .

Democratic primary

Candidates
Victoria Gray Adams, civil rights activist and member of the Mississippi Freedom Democratic Party
John C. Stennis, incumbent U.S. Senator

Results

General election

Results

See also 
 1964 United States Senate elections

References 

Single-candidate elections
1964
Mississippi
1964 Mississippi elections